A pirouette is a type of dance turn.

Pirouette may also refer to:
Pirouette (cookie), a type of rolled wafer
Pirouette (dressage), an equestrian movement
Pirouette (mouthpiece), a component of some music instruments
Pirouette (song), by A Loss for Words
Pirouette, a type of maneuver in playboating